The Roman Catholic Hospital is a private hospital in Windhoek, Namibia run by the Roman Catholic Church. Founded in 1907 by the Benedictine Missionary Sisters of Tutzing, the Roman Catholic Hospital had 87 beds in 2007.

References

Buildings and structures in Windhoek
Catholic hospitals in Africa
Hospitals in Namibia
Hospitals established in 1907
1907 establishments in German South West Africa